Thomas Kristl (born 18 April 1963) is a former professional football player and currently working as assistant coach for Sturm Graz.

Career 
His first senior football club was 1. FC Nürnberg. In 1990, he went to 1. FC Saarbrücken but in 1994 he went back to 1. FC Nürnberg, where he ended his career one year later after 71 appearances in the Bundesliga.

His first club where he was coach was 1. FC Schnaittach. He worked there from 1997 to 2005. In the seasons 2005–06 and 2006–07 he was assistant-coach at Hannover 96.

After two terms at 1. FC Amberg (2006–07 and 2008) he went 2008 to SSV Jahn Regensburg in the 3. Liga (the third highest league in Germany) where he was fired on 24 November 2008. and signed on 11 July 2009 a contract as assistant of Franco Foda by SK Sturm Graz. On 12 April 2012, after the sacking of Franco Foda, Kristl was named as caretaker manager of SK Sturm Graz.

References

External links 
 

1963 births
Living people
Sportspeople from Regensburg
German footballers
Bundesliga players
2. Bundesliga players
1. FC Nürnberg players
1. FC Saarbrücken players
German football managers
SSV Jahn Regensburg managers
3. Liga managers
FC Amberg managers
Association football midfielders
Footballers from Bavaria
Türkgücü München players